Dolní Podluží (until 1947 Dolní Grund) is a municipality and village in Děčín District in the Ústí nad Labem Region of the Czech Republic. It has about 1,200 inhabitants.

Administrative parts
Villages of Kateřina and Světliny 2.díl are administrative parts of Dolní Podluží.

History
The first written mention of Dolní Podluží is from 1485, as a village named Grunt. The village was later divided into two parts, Dolní and Horní Grunt ("Lower Grunt" and "Upper Grunt"; today Horní Podluží). Dolní Grunt is first mentioned in 1566. Between 1681 and 1850, it was a property of the Liechtenstein family as a part of Rumburk manor.

Until 1918, the municipality was a part of the Austrian monarchy (Austria side after the compromise of 1867), in the Rumburg (Rumburk) District, one of the 94 Bezirkshauptmannschaften in Bohemia.

References

Villages in Děčín District